Kaun Kare Insaaf is a Punjabi directed by Baljit Singh and was released on 25 September 2015. Film is based on 1984 Sikh genocide.

Cast
Varsha Choudhary
Lakha Lakhwinder Singh
Karan Sandhawalia
Raj Dhaliwal
Lakha Lehri
Gurinder Makna
Manjit Kala
Girish
Khushi
Preet
Elisha Shabdish
Roopi Rupinder
Balkar Singh
Parminder Gill

References

2015 films
Punjabi-language Indian films
2010s Punjabi-language films